Events from the year 1273 in Ireland.

Incumbent
Lord: Edward I

Events
 28 September –  William Fitz Richard de Barry, granted the church of Cahirduggan to the Priory of Ballybeg by charter.

Births
 Maurice FitzGerald, 3rd Lord of Offaly

Deaths

References

 
1270s in Ireland
Ireland
Years of the 13th century in Ireland